The Jerome Street Bridge is an arch bridge across the Youghiogheny River connecting the east and west banks of the Pittsburgh industrial suburb of McKeesport, Pennsylvania. It was engineered by George S. Richardson. Originally, an 1880s truss bridge stood on the site. This structure mainly served streetcar traffic and was inadequate for automobiles. A Great Depression-era public works bond was provided to fund the creation of a new auto-centric four-lane highway bridge.

After the city renamed Jerome Street which approached the bridge after incumbent Republican Mayor George Lysle, they proposed that the Youghiogheny crossing receive the same moniker. However, the Franklin Roosevelt administration contended that public works dollars could not be used to memorialize living officeholders. As a result, the Jerome Street designation was chosen, and it remains in place today, although it is sometimes referred to as the Lysle Boulevard Bridge.

References

External links
PGH Bridges
Nat'l Bridge

Through arch bridges in the United States
Road bridges on the National Register of Historic Places in Pennsylvania
Bridges in Allegheny County, Pennsylvania
Bridges completed in 1937
Pittsburgh History & Landmarks Foundation Historic Landmarks
McKeesport, Pennsylvania
National Register of Historic Places in Allegheny County, Pennsylvania
Bridges over the Youghiogheny River
Metal bridges in the United States
Tied arch bridges in the United States